The 2011 Credit Suisse Women's Masters Basel were held from October 7 to 9 at the Curlingzentrum Region Basel in Basel, Switzerland as part of the 2011–12 World Curling Tour. The purse for the event was CHF32,050. The event was played in a triple knockout format.

Teams

Results

A Event

B Event

C Event

Playoffs

External links
Event Home Page

2011 in curling